WOYS (Oyster Radio, 106.5 FM) is a radio station broadcasting a classic rock format licensed to Carrabelle, Florida, United States, and serving Apalachicola and Port St. Joe. The station is owned by East Bay Broadcasting, Inc., and originates from studios in Eastpoint.

Prior to the current format, it had broadcast as sports, Top 40 Hitz 106, and Oyster Country.

History
The station went on the air in 1998 as WOCY.

Effective February 7, 2022, Live Communications Inc., owned by the Rev. Dr. R.B. Holmes, Jr., sold the station to East Bay Broadcasting, which owned WOYS (100.5 FM). The Christian and country Cross Country format on the 106.5 frequency was dropped in order to move WOYS to the higher-power 106.5 frequency on April 1, 2022.

References

External links

OYS
Radio stations established in 1999
1999 establishments in Florida
Classic rock radio stations in the United States